John George Bass (9 August 1903 – 16 October 1992) was an English cricketer.  Bass was a right-handed batsman who bowled right-arm medium pace.  He was born at Abington, Northamptonshire.

Bass made two first-class appearances for Northamptonshire in the 1935 County Championship against Leicestershire and Sussex.  In the match against Leicestershire, Bass scored 5 runs in Northamptonshire's first-innings, before becoming one of eight victims for Haydon Smith.  In their second-innings, he scored 16 runs before becoming one of seven victims for George Geary.  He also bowled thirteen wicketless overs in this match.  In the match against Sussex at Horsham, Bass scored 12 runs in Northamptonshire's first-innings, before being dismissed by Alan Melville, while in their second-innings the same bowler dismissed him for 10 runs.

He died at Northampton, Northamptonshire on 16 October 1992.

References

External links
John Bass at ESPNcricinfo
John Bass at CricketArchive

1903 births
1992 deaths
Cricketers from Northampton
English cricketers
Northamptonshire cricketers
People from Abington, Northamptonshire